Joseph Guy LaPointe Jr. (July 2, 1948 – June 2, 1969) was a combat medic in the United States Army who posthumously received the Medal of Honor for his actions during the Vietnam War.

Biography
LaPointe, known to his family as "Guy", was born and raised in Dayton, Ohio. After graduating from Northridge High School in 1966, he moved to nearby Clayton and worked as a mail carrier in Englewood. LaPointe was a nature lover and an avid hiker.

LaPointe was drafted in 1968 and declared himself a conscientious objector. He married Cindy Failor of Dayton, Ohio at the Englewood First Baptist Church in Ohio, during his training at the Army Medical Training Center, Fort Sam Houston, Texas. He became a combat medic and was sent to Vietnam in November 1968.

By June 2 of the next year, he was a specialist four serving with the 2nd Squadron, 17th Cavalry Regiment, 101st Airborne Division. On that day, he participated in a patrol on Hill 376 in Quảng Tín Province during Operation Lamar Plain. When his unit came under heavy fire from entrenched enemy forces and took several casualties, LaPointe ran through the automatic weapons fire to reach two wounded men at the head of the patrol. He treated the soldiers and shielded them with his body, even after being twice wounded, until an enemy grenade killed all three men. For these actions, he was posthumously awarded the Medal of Honor in January 1972. His other decorations include the Silver Star, Bronze Star, and National Defense Service Medal. 

He left a "widow, Cindy LaPointe Dafler, and son Joseph G. LaPointe III, who... never met his father."

Medal of Honor citation
LaPointe's official Medal of Honor citation reads:
Citation

Legacy
Several structures have been named in LaPointe's honor:
 Housing complex and medical complex in Fort Campbell, Kentucky
 Medical heliport in Fort Benning, Georgia
 Army Reserve Center in Riverside, Ohio. On June 2, 2009, the 40th anniversary of his death, LaPointe's widow and son were presented with the Medal of Honor flag during a ceremony at the LaPointe Army Reserve Center in Riverside.
 A portion of Ohio State Route 49 in Montgomery County has been designated the "Joseph G. LaPointe Jr. Memorial Highway".

See also

 List of Medal of Honor recipients for the Vietnam War
 Desmond Doss
 Harold A. Garman
 Thomas W. Bennett
 Gary M. Rose

References

External links
 
 

1948 births
1969 deaths
United States Army soldiers
Military personnel from Dayton, Ohio
Combat medics
American military personnel killed in the Vietnam War
Recipients of the Silver Star
United States Army Medal of Honor recipients
Conscientious objector Medal of Honor recipients
Vietnam War recipients of the Medal of Honor
People from Clayton, Ohio
Deaths by hand grenade
United States Army personnel of the Vietnam War